François Delecour (born 30 August 1962) is a French rally driver.

Biography

Career in World Rally Championship
François Delecour began rallying in 1981, in the French national championship. He entered his first major event, the Monte Carlo Rally, three years later, driving a Talbot Samba. He was co driven by his then girlfriend Anne Chantal Pauwels. For 1985 and 1986 he drove in the Peugeot 205 Cup, finishing third in both seasons. This was enough to earn him a degree of support from the Peugeot works team for subsequent years, culminating in a full works drive in a Peugeot 309 in 1989 and 1990, in which year he finished ninth overall and first two-wheel-drive car on the Monte Carlo.

Delecour was then hired by the Ford team to contest the 1991 World Championship. The four-wheel-drive Ford Sierra Cosworth, introduced the previous season, was not regarded as fully competitive, but Delecour demonstrated a remarkable turn of speed on the Monte Carlo Rally. He took the lead from reigning world champion Carlos Sainz on the third day and seemed certain to win until he lost five minutes with suspension failure on the final night and dropped to third place. Delecour retired from the next three events he contested, but then took fourth and third places on the San Remo and Catalunya rallies and sixth on the final round of the series, the RAC Rally in Great Britain, to finish seventh in the driver's championship. Delecour remained with Ford for the 1992 season, and was joined by twice world champion Massimo Biasion. Results were generally better than in 1991, with second places for Biasion in Portugal and Delecour on the Tour de Corse. Delecour also took third place on the San Remo, leaving him sixth in the World Championship.

For 1993 the Sierra was replaced by the smaller and more agile Ford Escort RS Cosworth. Delecour immediately showed its potential by leading the Monte Carlo until the final night, with Biasion second. However, both lost out to a final-night charge by Didier Auriol, and finished second and third. Delecour at this time was still regarded as a specialist on asphalt rallies, but he finally established his reputation as an effective driver on all surfaces by winning the third round of the series, the Portuguese Rally, again with Biasion second. He won again in Corsica, giving him the championship lead. However, retirement in Greece and San Remo saw the title pass to Juha Kankkunen, although Delecour compensated somewhat by winning the Catalunya Rally and finishing a strong fourth on the RAC, giving him second place in the World Championship.  His co-driver, Daniel Grataloup, was awarded the co-driver's championship for that year.
After his strong showing in 1993, Delecour was widely regarded as the strongest contender for the 1994 world title, and he duly won the Monte Carlo Rally.  However, he retired with engine failure in Portugal. A month later he was involved in a road accident, when the Ferrari F40 he was driving was hit, ironically by an amateur rally driver practicing for a local event. Delecour suffered severe leg injuries and was forced to miss the next four rounds of the series. He returned to action in Finland and finished fourth, before retiring from the final two events of the year.

At the end of 1994 the official Ford team was closed down, and cars were instead run by Belgian concern RAS Sport. Biasion left the team, leaving Delecour as lead driver, backed up by Bruno Thiry. However, the Escort was less competitive than in the previous year and he failed to win an event, although he finished second in Monte Carlo and Corsica. His final event for the Ford team was in Sweden in 1996.

After leaving Ford, Delecour was hired by Peugeot to head their campaign for the French Rally Championship, driving the Peugeot 306 kit-car.  He finished third in the championship in both 1996 and 1997, winning several events outright along the way.  Moreover, he also contested some of the asphalt rounds of the World Championship, where the Peugeot was fast enough to be a contender for outright victory. He finished fourth on both the 1996 and 1997 Tour de Corse.  Subsequently, he was involved in the early years of the Peugeot 206 WRC project, which saw him return to the World Championship for the 1999 season.  He did not win any events, but scored consistent top-ten finishes, including second place in Corsica and San Remo, the latter marred by acrimony between Delecour and team-mate Gilles Panizzi, who went on to win the event.

Delecour switched back to Ford for 2001. The Blue Oval's effort, however, was by now being masterminded not from long-time headquarters Boreham, but by Malcolm Wilson's M-Sport in Cumbria, which ran a third, alternatively liveried Ford Focus RS WRC 01 for Delecour. A shunt, nearly crippling for co-driver Daniel Grataloup, on his final outing in Australia threatened to mar his time at the team. But despite otherwise again proving a regular scorer, he was once again to change teams come the following year, this time to Mitsubishi to drive their still young first World Rally Car, he and Alister McRae being drafted in as replacements for both outgoing four-time World Champion, Tommi Makinen and his teammate Freddy Loix.

Unfortunately, both he and McRae were to suffer as the Japanese marque's competitiveness continued to wane. During this time Delecour again suffered a massive shunt during that year's Rally Australia. This time the accident had effectively ended Grataloup's top line career due to injuries he sustained as a result of the accident. Delecour, despite his accident, would go on to compete at the next event in Great Britain. This event was noted as Delecour's Mitsubishi left the road in the middle of the event causing him to lose his temper at his replacement co-driver Dominique Savignoni. After a comparatively unsuccessful season, Mitsubishi announced a sabbatical from the series until 2004, effectively bringing Delecour's world championship career to a close.

Later career and comeback in Monte Carlo 

After WRC career Delecour did rally-raid with SMG V8 buggy and some racing with Porsche 996 GT3 RS. In 2011, 100th year of Monte Carlo rally, he returned to rallying with Peugeot 207 Super 2000 and finished on 5th place in Rallye Monte Carlo, which was part of IRC-Championship.

In December 2011 it was announced that Delecour would make a comeback to WRC. He ran the latest-spec Fiesta WRC in 2012 Monte Carlo Rally. In the rally Delecour finished 6th and drove some top 3 stage times during the event.

In 2012 Delecour also returned to the IRC-championship in Rally Corsica, in which he drove a Visit Romania-backed Renault Mégane RS in IRC Production Cup and IRC 2WD Cup. Delecour finished third in his class and said he would like to do more IRC rallies in the future. Delecour competed in 2012 in the Romanian Rally Championship, winning 5 rallies on the way to the title and also finishing third among the IRC drivers in the Sibiu Rally with his Peugeot 207 S2000, the Romanian event being part of the IRC championship Late 2012 Delecour announced he would take part in European Rally Championship with Peugeot 207 S2000 in 2013 and he will be co-driven by Dominique Savignoni. Delecour also defended his Romanian Rally Championship title in 2013.

In December 2013 it was announced that Delecour, after winning the Romanian championship for the second time, would take part in Rally Monte Carlo 2014 with M-Sport Ford Fiesta RS WRC. Unfortunately, he was forced to retire on the first stage because of a broken accelerator.

In 2014 Delecour continued participating in the Romanian Rally Championship and won the title for the third time. He also returned to WRC for 2014 edition of Rallye de France Alsace with Tuthill Porsche 911 RGT and finished 37th, after a small off that damaged the car's radiator. After the rally Delecour told he will work for FIA R-GT Cup, a championship in which he wants to compete in 2015.

In early 2015 it was announced that Delecour would participate in FIA's new R-GT Cup series for GT cars in the World and European Rally Championships with a Porsche 911 run by Tuthill team. Rallies include Monte Carlo, Ypres Rally, Rally Germany, Rally Valais and the Tour of Corsica. In Monte Carlo, Delecour won his class and finished on 23rd place in overall results with his Porsche. In Ypres Rally, Delecour finished second in RGT Cup class. He finished second again in RGT cup event in Rallye Deutschland, but his overall position was 53rd after suffering from problems, including going off in the second day of the rally. Delecour won the next event, Tour de Corse, and secured the victory of FIA R-GT championship.

In 2023 François Delecours entered the Monte Carlo WRC round in a privately entered Rally 2 Skoda. He finished 10th in his category.

European Rally Championship 2013
In the first event of ERC 2013 in Jänner Rallye, Delecour finished seventh, after suffering a time penalty due a timing error by the crew and a spin and a puncture. In following event in Latvia, Delecour finished third. Delecour - sponsored by Visit Romania and therefore prioritizing his campaign in Eastern Europe over his ERC rallies if the events clash - decided to skip the ERC event Rally Islas Canarias El Corte Inglés in order to contest the Romanian Rally Championship Tess Rally Braşov, which he won. Next ERC event for Delecour was Rally of Corsica, in which he finished fifth. In Sibiu Rally Romania Delecour scored his second podium of his ERC season by finishing second, behind Jan Kopecký, while scoring top points for Romanian rally championship. He did not compete in other ERC events that year, but finished 4th in the Championship.

WRC victories 
{|class="wikitable"
! # 
!Event
!Season
!Co-driver
!Car
|-
| 1
|  27° Rallye de Portugal
|rowspan=3| 1993
|rowspan=4| Daniel Grataloup
|rowspan=4| Ford Escort RS Cosworth
|-
| 2
|  37ème Tour de Corse – Rallye de France
|-
| 3
|  29° Rallye Catalunya-Costa Brava (Rallye de España)
|-
| 4
|  62ème Rallye Automobile de Monte-Carlo
| 1994
|}

Career results

Complete WRC results

* Season still in progress.

IRC results

European Rally Championship results

FIA R-GT Cup results

Complete FIA European Rallycross Championship results

Division 2

References

External links

Delecour's Twitter
Delecour's profile on eWRC
Delecour's profile on World Rally Archive

1962 births
Living people
People from Hazebrouck
French rally drivers
World Rally Championship drivers
French racing drivers
Intercontinental Rally Challenge drivers
European Rally Championship drivers
Sportspeople from Nord (French department)
Peugeot Sport drivers
M-Sport drivers